What About Me is the fifth album by American psychedelic rock band Quicksilver Messenger Service. Released in December 1970 and recorded partly at the same sessions that produced Just for Love, the album is the last to feature pianist Nicky Hopkins and the last pre-reunion effort to feature founding members David Freiberg and John Cipollina.

Reception

Writing for Allmusic, music critic Lindsay Planer wrote of the album "Musically, there is little to delineate the fifth long-player from Quicksilver Messenger Service, What About Me, from their previous effort, Just for Love. Not surprisingly, material for both was initiated during a prolific two-month retreat..."

Track listing

Side one
"What About Me" (Jesse Oris Farrow) – 6:43
"Local Color" (John Cipollina) – 3:00
"Baby Baby" (Farrow) – 4:44
"Won't Kill Me" (David Freiberg) – 2:32
"Long Haired Lady" (Farrow) – 5:55

Side two
"Subway" (Gary Duncan, Farrow) – 4:29
"Spindrifter" (Nicky Hopkins) – 4:38
"Good Old Rock and Roll" (Farrow) – 2:30
"All in My Mind" (Duncan, Farrow) – 3:48
"Call on Me" (Farrow) – 7:36

Personnel
Quicksilver Messenger Service
 Dino Valenti – lead vocals (except on "Won't Kill Me"), guitar, percussion
 Gary Duncan – guitar, backing vocals, bass, percussion, organ
 John Cipollina – guitar, percussion
 David Freiberg – bass, backing vocals, lead vocal on "Won't Kill Me", guitar
 Greg Elmore – drums, percussion
 Nicky Hopkins – piano (except on "What About Me", "Baby Baby", "Subway", and "Call on Me")
 Mark Naftalin - piano on "What About Me", "Baby Baby", and "Call on Me"

Additional musicians on "What About Me" and "Call on Me"
 Martin Fierro - tenor and alto saxophone, flute
 Frank Morin - tenor saxophone
 Pat O'Hara - trombone
 Jose Rico Reyes - conga, percussion, backing vocals
 Ron Taormina - baritone and soprano saxophone

Charts
Album

Single

References

Quicksilver Messenger Service albums
1970 albums
Capitol Records albums